The Battle of Mecca took place on 5 December 1924 in Mecca, as part of the Saudi conquest of the Kingdom of Hejaz by King Abdulaziz Ibn Saud of the Sultanate of Nejd. The Hejaz region was ruled as a kingdom under King Hussein bin Ali of the Hashemite family. The battle in Mecca resulted in a Hashemite defeat to the Saudis and the allied Ikhwan fighters.

Background 
After the fall of the city of Ta'if to Ibn Saud in September 1924, King Hussein bin Ali fled from Mecca to Jeddah on 6 October 1924 on the advice of Hejazi notables and declared his son Ali bin Hussein the King of Hejaz. From Jeddah, Hussein was transported by the British to Aqaba by boat and later to Cyprus. The abdication only further emboldened Ibn Saud to march upon Mecca, entering the city of 5 December 1924. The abandonment of the city left behind a cache of weapons in the Qishla of Mecca which were recovered by Saudi forces.

Aftermath 
Ibn Saud declared that Ali bin Hussein was to leave Hejaz as a pre-requisite for peace and that the invasion of Hejaz was to 'guarantee the liberty of pilgrimage and to settle the destiny of the Holy Land in a manner satisfactory to the Islamic world'. 

Following the capture of Mecca, Ali and the remaining Hejazi forces were concentrated in the port city of Jeddah which would later be besieged in January 1925 by the Saudi forces. The siege lasted until 16 December 1925 when, with British mediation, Sharif Ali surrendered and left the city for Baghdad. In the same month, Ibn Saud declared himself King of Hejaz in addition to Sultan of Nejd.

See also
History of Saudi Arabia

References

Further reading
Al-Harbi, Dalal: King Abdulaziz and his Strategies to deal with events : Events of Jeddah. 2003, King Abdulaziz national library.  .

History of Saudi Arabia
Mecca (1924)
1924 in Saudi Arabia
History of Mecca
20th century in Mecca
Kingdom of Hejaz
Mecca